The 2018–19 Coupe de France preliminary rounds, overseas departments and territories, make up the qualifying competition to decide which teams from the French overseas departments and territories take part in the main competition from the seventh round.

Mayotte

First round 
These matches were played on 18 April 2018.

Note: Mayotte League structure (no promotion to French League structure):Régionale 1 (R1)Régionale 2 (R2)Régionale 3 (R3)

Second round 
These matches were played on 11 and 22 August 2018.

Note: Mayotte League structure (no promotion to French League structure):Régionale 1 (R1)Régionale 2 (R2)Régionale 3 (R3)

Third round 
These matches were played on 11 and 22 August 2018.

Note: Mayotte League structure (no promotion to French League structure):Régionale 1 (R1)Régionale 2 (R2)Régionale 3 (R3)

Fourth round 
These matches were played on 1 September 2018.

Note: Mayotte League structure (no promotion to French League structure):Régionale 1 (R1)Régionale 2 (R2)Régionale 3 (R3)

Fifth round 
These matches were played on 22 September 2018.

Note: Mayotte League structure (no promotion to French League structure):Régionale 1 (R1)Régionale 2 (R2)Régionale 3 (R3)

Sixth round 
This match was played on 13 October 2018.

Note: Mayotte League structure (no promotion to French League structure):Régionale 1 (R1)Régionale 2 (R2)Régionale 3 (R3)

French Guiana

Third round 
This season, the preliminary rounds start with the third round, due to the number of teams entered. These matches were played on 24, 25, 26 and 29 August 2018.

Note: French Guiana League structure (no promotion to French League structure):

Regional 1 (R1)

Regional 2 (R2)

Fourth round 
These matches were played on 15, 16 and 18 September 2018.

Note: French Guiana League structure (no promotion to French League structure):

Regional 1 (R1)

Regional 2 (R2)

Fifth round 
These matches were played on 29 and 30 September 2018.

Note: French Guiana League structure (no promotion to French League structure):

Regional 1 (R1)

Regional 2 (R2)

Sixth round 
These matches were played on 21 October 2018.

Note: French Guiana League structure (no promotion to French League structure):

Regional 1 (R1)

Regional 2 (R2)

Guadeloupe

Second round 
This season, the preliminary rounds start with the second round, due to the number of clubs entering. These matches were played on 22, 24, 25 and 26 August 2018.

Note: Guadeloupe League structure (no promotion to French League structure):

Ligue Régionale 1 (R1)

Ligue Régionale 2 (R2)

Ligue Régionale 3 (R3)

Third round 
These matches were played on 31 August and 1,2 and 5 September 2018.

Note: Guadeloupe League structure (no promotion to French League structure):

Ligue Régionale 1 (R1)

Ligue Régionale 2 (R2)

Ligue Régionale 3 (R3)

Fourth round 
These matches were played on 2 and 3 October 2018.

Note: Guadeloupe League structure (no promotion to French League structure):

Ligue Régionale 1 (R1)

Ligue Régionale 2 (R2)

Ligue Régionale 3 (R3)

Fifth round 
These matches were played on 19 and 20 October 2018.

Note: Guadeloupe League structure (no promotion to French League structure):

Ligue Régionale 1 (R1)

Ligue Régionale 2 (R2)

Ligue Régionale 3 (R3)

Sixth round 

These matches were played on 23 and 24 October 2018.

Note: Guadeloupe League structure (no promotion to French League structure):

Ligue Régionale 1 (R1)

Ligue Régionale 2 (R2)

Ligue Régionale 3 (R3)

Réunion

Second round 
This season, the preliminary rounds start with the second round, referred to locally as the first round of the regional competition, due to the number of participants requiring fewer rounds than other regions.

These matches were played on 21 and 22 April and 2 May 2018.

Note: Reúnion League structure (no promotion to French League structure):Régionale 1 (R1)Régionale 2 (R2)D2 Départemental (D2D)

Third round 
These matches were played on 12 and 13 May 2018.

Note: Reúnion League structure (no promotion to French League structure):Régionale 1 (R1)Régionale 2 (R2)D2 Départemental (D2D)

Fourth round 
These matches were played on 2 and 3 June 2018.

Note: Reúnion League structure (no promotion to French League structure):Régionale 1 (R1)Régionale 2 (R2)D2 Départemental (D2D)

Fifth round 
These matches were played on 21, 22, 23 and 25 September 2018.

Note: Reúnion League structure (no promotion to French League structure):Régionale 1 (R1)Régionale 2 (R2)D2 Départemental (D2D)

Sixth round 
These were played on 27 and 28 October 2018.

Note: Reúnion League structure (no promotion to French League structure):Régionale 1 (R1)Régionale 2 (R2)

Martinique

Second round 
This season, the preliminary rounds start with the second round, due to the number of clubs entered.
These matches were played on 25 and 26 August 2018.

Note: Martinique League structure (no promotion to French League structure):Régionale 1 (R1)Régionale 2 (R2)Régionale 3 (R3)

Third round 
These matches were played on 31 August, 1 and 2 September and 3 October 2018.

Note: Martinique League structure (no promotion to French League structure):Régionale 1 (R1)Régionale 2 (R2)Régionale 3 (R3)

Fourth round 
These matches were played on 25 and 26 September and 6 October 2018.

Note: Martinique League structure (no promotion to French League structure):

Régionale 1 (R1)

Régionale 2 (R2)

Régionale 3 (R3)

Fifth round 
These matches were played on 5, 6 and 12 October 2018.

Note: Martinique League structure (no promotion to French League structure):

Régionale 1 (R1)

Régionale 2 (R2)

Régionale 3 (R3)

Sixth round 
These matches were played on 23 and 24 October 2018.

Note: Martinique League structure (no promotion to French League structure):

Régionale 1 (R1)

Régionale 2 (R2)

Régionale 3 (R3)

Saint Pierre and Miquelon

First round 
The overseas collectivity of Saint Pierre and Miquelon has teams participating in the qualification rounds of the competition for the first time. With only three teams in the collectivity, there was just one first round match, with the third team receiving a bye to the second round.

The match was played on 24 June 2018.

Second round 
With only three teams in the collectivity, there was just one second round match, with the winner  entered into the third round draw in the Bourgogne-Franche-Comté region.

The match was played on 4 July 2018.

References 

2018–19 Coupe de France